Karl Kreibich may refer to 
Karl Kreibich (dermatologist)
Karl Kreibich (politician, born 1867)
Karl Kreibich (politician, born 1883)